The Men's 2007 European Union Amateur Boxing Championships were held in Dublin, Ireland from 18 June to 23 June. The 5th edition of the annual competition was organised by the European governing body for amateur boxing, EABA. A total number of 119 fighters from across Europe competed at these championships.

Medal winners

References

External links
Results

European Union Amateur Boxing Championships, 2007
European Union Amateur Boxing Championships, 2007
International boxing competitions hosted by Ireland
European Union Amateur Boxing Championships
Boxing in County Dublin